The 2008 Wisconsin Republican presidential primary was held on February 19, 2008. Polls in Wisconsin opened at 7:00 AM and closed 8:00 PM (local time)   John McCain won the primary.

Polls leading up to Primary

Last 3 Poll Averages

Results

Official Results

*Candidate stopped campaign before primary

See also
 2008 Republican Party presidential primaries
 2008 Wisconsin Democratic presidential primary

References

Wisconsin
2008 Wisconsin elections
2008